The Men's 5000 metre relay at the 2011 World Short Track Speed Skating Championships began on 12 March, and ended on 13 March at the Sheffield Arena.

The top eight teams from the World Cup season competed.

Results

Semifinals
Top 2 Athletes from each heat qualified for the final.

Heat 1

Heat 2

Final

References

2011 World Short Track Speed Skating Championships